Epidendrum radicans is a species of orchid. Common names include ground-rooting epidendrum, fire-star orchid, rainbow orchid, and reed-stem epidendrum. It is a common roadside weed at middle elevations in Central America.  It is a crucifix orchid, often confused with many other members of the section Schistochila, including E. calanthe, E. cinnabarinum, E. denticulatum, E. erectum, E. fulgens, E. ibaguense, E. imatophyllum, E. incisum, E. schomburgkii, E. secundum, and E. xanthinum, among others.  The diagnostic characteristic of E. radicans is its tendency to sprout roots all along the length of the stem; other crucifix orchids only produce roots near the base.  Additionally, E. radicans flowers are resupinate, unlike the members of the Epidendrum secundum complex, E. fulgens, and many other crucifix orchids.  E. radicans also differs from E. secundum by bearing no nectar in the flower.

Description 
E. radicans, like other members of subgenus Amphiglottium, is a sympodial orchid which grows stems which do not swell into pseudobulbs and are covered with imbricating sheaths, produces a terminal inflorescence covered at its base by close imbricating sheaths, and produces a lip adnate to the column to its apex.  The lip of E. radicans is trilobate, as with the other members of section Schistochila, with the lacerate lobes which are typical of the subsections Carinata and Tuberculata.  E. radicans differs from the other lacerate Schistochila by producing roots from most of the stem.

E. radicans seeds are quite small, at 320 seeds per milligram.

The chromosome number of an individual collected in Ecuador has been determined as 2n = 60. Other reported chromosome numbers for E. radicans include 2n = 40, 2n = 57, 2n = 62, and 2n = 64

Taxonomic placement 
A biochemical examination (Pinheiro & al., 2009) of the lacerate Schistochila subsections encompassing plastid nucleotide sequence data from the trnL—trnF regions, Amplified Fragment Length Polyorphism (AFLP) data, and somatic chromosome number for 30 individuals in three of the thirteen recognized species of E. subsect. Tuberculata and twenty individuals in eleven of the twelve recognized species of E. subsect. Carinata, including E. radicans, has suggested that perhaps E. subsect. Carinata should be replaced with three subsections:  an "Atlantic" subsection, an "Andean" subsection, and a monotypic subsection for E. radicans.

Ecology 
E. radicans is part of a complex of several orange-flowered, weedy species (including Asclepias spp.) that are unrelated but ecologically similar. Species within this group share pollinators as well as habitat, and are believed to exhibit what is known as convergent evolution, where unrelated species "converge" upon similar physical characteristics as a result of similar evolutionary pressures.  Paulette Bierzychudek studied pollinator behavior in the apparent complex consisting of E. radicans, Asclepias curassavica, and Lantana camara, but could not find clear evidence that floral mimicry was affecting pollination rates for any of the three species.

Notes

References 
 Pansarin, E. R., and Amaral, M. C. E.:  "Reproductive biology and pollination mechanisms of Epidendrum secundum (Orchidaceae).  Floral variation:  a consequence of natural hybridization?" Plant Biology 10 (2008) 211-219
Paulette Bierzychudek:  "Asclepias, Lantana, and Epidendrum: A Floral Mimicry Complex?" Biotropica, 13, 2, Supplement: Reproductive Botany (Jun., 1981), pp. 54–58, published by The Association for Tropical Biology and Conservation

External links 

radicans
Orchids of Ecuador